Ramon Terrats Espacio (born 18 October 2000) is a Spanish footballer who plays as a central midfielder for Villarreal CF B, on loan from Girona FC.

Club career
Born in Barcelona, Catalonia, Terrats represented CE Europa and CF Damm as a youth. On 27 June 2019, after finishing his formation, he signed a one-year contract with Tercera División side UE Sant Andreu.

Terrats made his senior debut on 15 September 2019, coming on as a second-half substitute in a 1–1 home draw against Cerdanyola del Vallès FC. He left the club the following 22 July after being sparingly used, and signed for Girona FC two days later, being initially assigned to the reserves also in the fourth division.

Terrats made his first team debut for the Blanquivermells on 4 November 2020, starting in a 2–2 Segunda División away draw against Real Zaragoza. The following 24 February, he renewed his contract until 2024.

Terrats was mainly a backup option during the 2021–22 season, as his side achieved promotion to La Liga. He made his top tier debut on 14 August 2022, starting in a 1–0 loss at Valencia CF.

On 18 January 2023, Terrats was loaned to Villarreal CF B in the second division, until the end of the season.

Personal life
Terrats' brother Tomás is also a footballer. A goalkeeper, he was also groomed at Europa.

References

External links

2000 births
Living people
Footballers from Barcelona
Spanish footballers
Association football midfielders
La Liga players
Segunda División players
Tercera División players
UE Sant Andreu footballers
Girona FC B players
Girona FC players
Villarreal CF B players